Amphi Ashdod is an open theater that is located in Ashdod-Yam Park, near the Arches Beach of Ashdod, Israel.

Amphi Ashdod is one of the biggest theaters in Israel and it can host more than 6,400 spectators. It contains 4,500 seats, a large grass area that can fit another 1,700 guests and a VIP section that can host 200 guests.

The Amphi hosts Israeli and international concerts during the Summer and Spring. In addition, the Amphi hosts the annual international art festival "Méditerranée".

The stage 
The Amphi's stage was designed as a shell and its elements resemble petals that open up. They also resemble sailboats. During the day, the spectators can see the Mediterranean Sea while looking at the stage.

Links 
 Video: The Amphi Being Built

Buildings and structures in Ashdod
Theatres in Ashdod